Top Club is a Scottish regional television game show produced by Grampian Television (now STV North) between 1971 and 1998.

History
Running for over 28 years, Top Club was an annual tournament of general knowledge quiz games involving clubs and organisations from the Northern Scotland region. The programme was the most watched regional light entertainment programme on the ITV network, winning audience shares of up to 46%.

Initially broadcast until 1974 as Top Team, the programme was axed in 1984 before being revived in 1989 with new presenter Frank Gilfeather, who continued until the series was axed for a second time in 1998.

References

External links
UKGameshows.com

1971 Scottish television series debuts
1998 Scottish television series endings
1970s British game shows
1980s British game shows
1990s British game shows
ITV game shows
Scottish television shows
Television shows produced by Grampian Television
1970s Scottish television series
1980s Scottish television series
1990s Scottish television series
English-language television shows